Xenitenus is a genus of beetles in the family Carabidae, containing the following species:

 Xenitenus andringitranus Mateu, 1975 
 Xenitenus bambuseti Basilewsky, 1958 
 Xenitenus brincki Basilewsky, 1958 
 Xenitenus debilis Peringuey, 1896 
 Xenitenus dilucidus Peringuey, 1896 
 Xenitenus inornatus Peringuey, 1896 
 Xenitenus katanganus Basilewsky, 1958 
 Xenitenus lateripictus (Motschulsky, 1864) 
 Xenitenus limbatus Peringuey, 1896 
 Xenitenus longevittatus Basilewsky, 1958 
 Xenitenus lucidus Basilewsky, 1988 
 Xenitenus maurus (Motschulsky, 1864) 
 Xenitenus natalicus Peringuey, 1904 
 Xenitenus occipitalis (Jeannel, 1949) 
 Xenitenus ornatellus Peringuey, 1896 
 Xenitenus tesselatus Peringuey, 1896

References

Lebiinae